The Detroit was an automobile manufactured in Detroit, Michigan by the Wheeler Manufacturing Company in 1904.  The Detroit was a five-seater tonneau with an entrance in the rear.  It had a 35 hp opposed two-cylinder engine, claimed to produce .  It had a removable wood top, and was offered in either red or green, with yellow running gear.

References
 

Defunct motor vehicle manufacturers of the United States
Motor vehicle manufacturers based in Michigan
Cars powered by boxer engines
Defunct manufacturing companies based in Detroit